Robert Fulton Odom, Jr. (July 20, 1935 – May 17, 2014), was the longest-serving Commissioner of Agriculture and Forestry in the U.S. state of Louisiana.

Electoral history
Commissioner of Agriculture and Forestry, 1987

Threshold > 50%

First ballot, October 24, 1987

Commissioner of Agriculture and Forestry, 1991

Threshold > 50%

First ballot, October 19, 1991

Commissioner of Agriculture and Forestry, 1995

Threshold > 50%

First ballot, October 21, 1995

Commissioner of Agriculture and Forestry, 1999

Threshold > 50%

First ballot, October 23, 1999

Commissioner of Agriculture and Forestry, 2003

Threshold > 50%

First ballot, October 4, 2003

Commissioner of Agriculture and Forestry, 2007

Threshold > 50%

First ballot, October 20, 2007

Runoff did not occur and Strain won due to Odom withdrawing.

See also

References

  

1935 births
2014 deaths
Farmers from Louisiana
Ranchers from Louisiana
Baptists from Louisiana
Military personnel from Louisiana
Louisiana Commissioners of Agriculture and Forestry
People from Haynesville, Louisiana
People from Zachary, Louisiana
Southeastern Louisiana University alumni
United States Marines
Louisiana Democrats
20th-century Baptists